The 1955 Minnesota Golden Gophers football team represented the University of Minnesota in the 1955 Big Ten Conference football season. In their second year under head coach Murray Warmath, the Golden Gophers compiled a 3–6 record and were outscored by their opponents by a combined total of 172 to 110.
 
Quarterback Don Swanson received the team's Most Valuable Player award, and fullback Dick Borstad and running back Bob Hobart were named to the Academic All-Big Ten team.

Total attendance for the season was 305,581, which averaged to 61,116. The season high for attendance was against Southern Cal.

Schedule

References

Minnesota
Minnesota Golden Gophers football seasons
Minnesota Golden Gophers football